George Joseph Hesik  (June 15, 1913 – April 18, 1994) was an American professional basketball and minor league baseball player. In basketball, he played for the Akron Goodyear Wingfoots and Sheboygan Red Skins in the National Basketball League. In baseball, he spent one season playing for the Bakersfield Indians.

Hesik played college baseball and basketball for Marquette University before turning professional. He also served in World War II.

References

1913 births
1994 deaths
Akron Goodyear Wingfoots players
United States Army personnel of World War II
Bakersfield Indians players
Baseball pitchers
Baseball players from Chicago
Basketball players from Chicago
Centers (basketball)
Forwards (basketball)
Marquette Golden Eagles baseball players
Marquette Golden Eagles men's basketball players
Sheboygan Red Skins players
American men's basketball players